Sean Zawadzki  (born April 21, 2000) is an American professional soccer player who plays for Major League Soccer side Columbus Crew

Youth and college career 
Zawadzki was part of the Columbus Crew academy between 2015 and 2018. Zawadzki played college soccer at Georgetown from 2018 to 2021. During his time with the Hoyas, he made 78 appearances and scored 4 goals. He was a two-year captain for the team; winning the 2019 NCAA College Cup and two Big East Tournaments.

Zawadzki played for the Long Island Rough Riders of USL League Two in 2019, playing in 10 games and scoring 2 goals.

Professional career 
On January 13, 2022, Zawadzki was announced as a homegrown player signing by Columbus Crew.

On June 29, 2022, Zawadzki scored his first goal for the Crew in a 2–1 win against Toronto FC.

Honors 
Georgetown Hoyas
NCAA College Cup: 2019

Columbus Crew 2
MLS Next Pro: 2022

References

External links 

 Sean Zawadzki at Georgetown Athletics

2000 births
American soccer players
Association football midfielders
Columbus Crew players
Long Island Rough Riders players
Homegrown Players (MLS)
Living people
Soccer players from Ohio
USL League Two players
Georgetown Hoyas men's soccer players
Major League Soccer players
Columbus Crew 2 players
MLS Next Pro players